Daniel Deribe Gebremichael (Amharic: ዳንኤል ደርቤ), born 25 March 1983, is an Ethiopian footballer, who currently plays for Hawassa City S.C.

International career
He plays for the Ethiopia national football team. He plays either right back or right wing.

References

External links
Dedebit SC / Ethiopian Football Federation

1983 births
Living people
Sportspeople from Southern Nations, Nationalities, and Peoples' Region
Ethiopian footballers
Ethiopia international footballers
Association football defenders
Association football midfielders